Rhammatophyllum is a genus of plants in the family Brassicaceae, found primarily in Central Asia.

Species:
 Rhammatophyllum afghanicum (Rech. f.) Al-Shehbaz & O. Appel	
 Rhammatophyllum erysimoides (Kar. & Kir.) Al-Shehbaz & O. Appel	
 Rhammatophyllum flexuosum (Rech. f.) Al-Shehbaz & O. Appel	
 Rhammatophyllum ghoranum (Rech. f.) Al-Shehbaz & O. Appel
 Rhammatophyllum kamelinii (Botsch.) Al-Shehbaz & O. Appel
 Rhammatophyllum pachyrhizum O.E. Schulz	
 Rhammatophyllum pseudoparrya (Botsch. & Vved.) Al-Shehbaz & O. Appel

References

Brassicaceae
Brassicaceae genera